Rokkaku-dō may refer to:
 Rokkaku-dō, Buddhist temple in Kyoto
 Rokkaku-dō (architecture)
 Rokkakudō (Kitaibaraki)